Leonard Francis Newton (Quarter 3 1882 – 27 February 1959) was a footballer who played as a centre forward. He played for five different teams in the Football League.

Newton was the brother of Frederick Newton who kept goal occasionally for Chesterfield and played cricket for Derbyshire.

References

1882 births
1959 deaths
People from Conisbrough
Footballers from Doncaster
English footballers
Association football forwards
Chesterfield F.C. players
Bradford City A.F.C. players
Oldham Athletic A.F.C. players
Bradford (Park Avenue) A.F.C. players
Burnley F.C. players
English Football League players
Leyton F.C. players